Barnala is a city located in the state of Azad Jammu & Kashmir, Pakistan.

The word "Barnala" literally translates to Bar (Edge) and Nala (River), which means "on the edge of a river"  and was a key location during the 1965 Battle of Chamb.

It serves as a tehsil (sub-division) of the district Bhimber, Azad Jammu & Kashmir.

Geography
Barnala is located on the bank of the Chenab River tributary and is 43.9 km (via Awan Sharif-Fatehpur Road) northeast of Gujrat District of the Punjab Province in Pakistan.

The boundaries of Barnala are connected with Bhimber, Kotla Arab Ali Khan, Gujrat, Sialkot, and Jammu. It is 200 km southeast of Rawalpindi, 180 km southeast of Islamabad, 60 km northwest of Sialkot, and 100 km northwest of Jammu.

Topography
Topographically, Barnala is divided into four regions:
Plain Region
Mountain Region
Hill Region
Cliff Region

Demography
As per the 2017 Census of Pakistan, the total population of the sub-division Barnala is approximately 137,629 (Projected in 2018 as 140,059). The population annual growth rate is nearly 1.7% with an average household size of 6.7.

Education

The area is divided into remote villages having schools up to primary education level mostly. After primary education majority of the students have to travel a certain distance to study at colleges. The literacy rate of tehsil Barnala was nearly 75% in 2017-2018 (as AJ & K Literacy rate in 2017-2018 was 76.80%). There are several colleges located in and around the sub-division.

Economy
Farming is the primary profession of the people as the area holds fertile land with both rain-fed and tube-well irrigated land. A portion of the young workforce is working abroad the country mainly in Gulf Countries and also across Europe including the entire globe. Business markets operate in the daytime and are almost closed before sunset. The area is known for its mango trees(commonly called desi mangoes دیسی آم) pine trees (صنوبر ،چیڑھ ) along with the cultivation and production of jujube (Beir: بیر ), mulberries(شہتوت), rice, sugar cane, mustard, millet, and wheat.
Fine and coarse aggregate materials (sand and crush) are also produced for use in the construction industry. Stone dust, also known as Khaka, is used in place of sand for the construction of temporary units and back-filling. Timber is also produced by this city.

Tourism
Pattni vale is a beautiful viewpoint for tourists and is situated near the LoC (Line of Control). Panjj Peer Darbar of village Amgah is a place that is mostly visited by Zaireen during Eid. The Mango Gardens of Watala, a historical site in Barnala, also attracts a wide range of tourists. Peer Monga Darbar is a place visited by Zaireen on a daily basis.

Landmarks

The central mosque of the city is the Bilal Masjid, while Muhammadi Masjid lies in the southeastern part of the city. The Barkat Plaza is the central shopping mall and is located on one of the main roads of the city. The Inter College for Boys Library and Girls Degree College are located in southwest Barnala. A small park called the Barnala Qabaristan is in the northwest regions whereas Kot Jamel road leads across a bridge over the Chenab tributary to the eastern parts of the city. The eastern side of the city is also home to the Government Boys Degree College, Masjid Ahl-e-Hadis mosque, and the Tawaqal Sanitary.MD colony(dhinganwalli)located almost 12 km far from barnala.

Union Councils
Tehsil Barnala consists of the following 7 union councils: 
 Barnala
 Pattni 
 Pangali
 Watala
 Malot
 North Iftikharabad (Chamb)
 South Iftikharabad (Chamb)
 Ambriyala

References 

Tehsils of Bhimber District